The Jat Regiment is an infantry regiment of the Indian Army, of which it is one of the longest-serving and most decorated regiments. The regiment has won 19 battle honours between 1839 and 1947, and post-independence it has won five battle honours, including 2 Victoria Cross, 8 Mahavir Chakra, 8 Kirti Chakra, 34 Shaurya Chakras, 39 Vir Chakras and 170 Sena Medals. During its 200-year service history, the regiment has participated in various actions and operations in India and abroad, including the First and the Second World Wars. Numerous battalions of the Jat Regiment,  including the 14th Murray's Jat Lancers, fought in the First World War.

History

The Regiment claims its origins from the Calcutta Native Militia that was raised in 1795, which later became an infantry battalion of the Bengal Army. The 14th Murray's Jat Lancers was formed in 1857. After 1860, there was a substantial increase in the recruitment of Jats into the British Indian Army. The Class Regiment(The Jats) was initially created in 1897 as infantry units from old battalions of the Bengal Army. In January 1922, at the time of the grouping of the Class Regiments of the Indian Army, the 9th Jat Regiment was formed by merging four active battalions and one training battalion into a single regiment.

The 1st Battalion was raised as the 22nd Bengal Native Infantry in 1803. The 2nd and 3rd Battalions were raised in 1817 and 1823 respectively. All three battalions had distinguished records of service, including the winning of many honours during World War I.

Objective
The British had a policy of recruiting the martial Indians from those who had less access to education as they were easier to control, so the British raised regiments of those martial races who were considered politically subservient, intellectually inferior, lacking the initiative or leadership qualities to command large military formations. According to modern historian Jeffrey Greenhunt on military history, "The Martial Race theory had an elegant symmetry. Indians who were intelligent and educated were defined as cowards, while those defined as brave were uneducated and backward". According to Amiya Samanta, the martial race was chosen from people of mercenary spirit (a soldier who fights for any group or country that will pay him/her), as these groups lacked nationalism as a trait.

Battle cry
The battle cry, adopted in 1955, in Hindi, is जाट बलवान, जय भगवान (IAST: Jāt Balwān, Jai Bhagwān) (The Jat is Powerful, Victory Be to God!).

Recruitment
Soldiers of the Jat Regiment are recruited 89% from the Jat community and rest from other castes of North Officers may be from any part of country.

Regimental battalions

The Jat regiment has 21 regular battalions, 4 Rastriya Rifles battalions and 2 territorial army battalions, as of August 2020.

Gallantry awards

Battle honours

Pre-1947

Nagpur & Afghanistan, 1839
Ghuznee (Ghazni, Ali Masjid & Kandahar), 1842
Cabool (Kabul), 1842
Maharajpore, Sobraon, Mooltan, Goojrat (Gujarat), Punjab & China, 1858–59
Kandahar 1880
Burma 1885–87
Afghanistan 1879–80
China 1900
La Bassée 1914
Festubert 1914–15
Shaiba, Ctesiphon, Khan al Baghdadi & Kut al Amara, 1915
Neuve-Chapelle, France & Flanders, 1914–15
Kut al Amara 1916
Mesopotamia 1914–18
North-West Frontier Province 1914–15 & 1917
Afghanistan 1919
Razabil & Burma, 1942–45
Jitra, Kanglatongbi & Malaya, 1941–42
Ninshigum, the Muars & North Africa, 1940–43

Post-1947

Zoji La & Rajauri, 1947
Jammu and Kashmir 1947–48
Phillora & Dograi 1965
Jammu and Kashmir & East Pakistan 1971

Unit citations
When a unit is decorated for counter-insurgency operations, unit citations are given instead of battle or theatre honours.

4th battalion, Nagaland 1995
7th battalion, J&K 1997, J&K 2003 & Operation Rhino 2016
11th battalion, Operation Rakshak 2011
34th battalion Rashtriya Rifles, J&K 1997
17th battalion, Operation Vijay 1999
16th battalion, Operation Rakshak 2005 & 2011
21st battalion, Operation Rhino 2009
22nd Battalion (JAGUARS), Operation Rakshak 2018

Victoria Cross
Risaldar Badlu Singh, 14th Murray's Jat Lancers attached to 29th Lancers (Deccan Horse), Palestine 1918.
Havildar Abdul Hafiz, 9th Jat Regiment, Imphal 1944.

Maha Vir Chakra
 Brig. (later Lt. Gen.) Joginder Singh Bakshi, 16 Jat, 1971
 Lt. Col. (later Brig.) Desmond Hayde, 3 Jat, Dograi 1965
 Maj. Asaram Tyagi, 3 Jat, 1965
 Capt. Anuj Nayyar, 17 Jat, Kargil 1999
 Capt. Kapil Singh Thapa, 3 Jat, 1965

Vir Chakra

Brig. Umesh Singh Bawa, 17 Jat, Kargil 1999
Lt. Col Raj Kumar Suri, 4 Jat, 1971 war
Maj. Harish Chandra Sharma, 4 Jat 1971 war
Maj. Narain Singh, 4 Jat 1971 war
Maj. Deepak Rampal, 17 Jat, Kargil 1999
Havildar Kumar Singh Sogarwal, 17 Jat, Kargil 1999
Havildar Shish Ram Gill, 8 Jat, Kargil 1999
Sep Dharajit Singh Chahar, 4 Jat, 1988 
Sub (later Capt.) Pahlad Singh, 2 Jat, 1971 war

Sub Brijendra Singh, 4 Jat, 1971 war

Ashok Chakra

Maj Sudhir Kumar Walia, 4 Jat (parent unit), 9 Para (Special Forces)
Col Jojan Thomas, 45 Rashtriya Rifles
Maj Dinesh Raghu Raman, 34 Rashtriya Rifles, PU 19 Jat,
Lance Naik Nazir Ahmad Wani, 34 Rashtriya Rifles

Others 

The Indira Gandhi Paryavaran Puraskar – 2010 (Organisation Category) was awarded to 21st Battalion, the Jat Regiment.
The launch of the 'Maujiram helpline' by the Jat Regiment Centre in June 2013.

Battles fought

 The Regiment saw a great deal of fighting in North Africa, Ethiopia, Burma, Malaya, Singapore, and Java-Sumatra. A large number of gallantry awards including a Victoria Cross and two George Crosses were won.
 Gates of Somnath temple
After the Battle of Kabul (1842),  Governor General Lord Ellenborough 
had ordered Major General William Nott, who was commanding British-Indian forces, to recover a set of ornate gates known as the Somnath Gates, which had been looted from India by the Afghans and hung at the tomb of Sultan Mahmud II. A whole sepoy regiment, the 43rd Bengal Native Infantry—which later became the 6th Jat Light Infantry after the Indian Rebellion of 1857—was tasked with carrying the gates back to India.
 WW1
 WW2
 1947 Indo-Pakistani War
 1962 Sino-Indian War
 1965 India-Pakistan War
 Battle of Dograi
In 1965 India-Pakistan War, 3 soldiers from Jat regiment under Lt Col (now Brig Retd) Desmond Hayde on 1 September and then again on 21–22 September, crossed the Ichhogil Canal and in the Battle of Dograi captured Dograi right up to Batapore-Attocke Awan, advancing towards Lahore.
 1971 India-Pakistan War
 Battle of Beriwala Bridge
 Kargil War
In the 1999 Kargil War, five of the regiment's battalions took part. The regiment has also contributed battalions to UN missions in Korea and Congo. It was also involved in counter-insurgency operations that have kept the Indian Army busy ever since independence.

See also
 Dev Samhita
 20th Lancers
 9th Jat Regiment

References

Further reading
War Services of the 9th Jat Regiment by Lieutenant Colonel W. L. Hailes details the military history of the Jat Regiment and of the Jat people between 1893 and 1937.

External links
6th Jat Light Infantry
Jat Regiment on Bharat-Rakshak

J
British Indian Army infantry regiments
Military units and formations established in 1795